Loraine Boettner (March 7, 1901 – January 3, 1990) was an American theologian, teacher, and author in the Reformed tradition. He is best known for his works on predestination, Roman Catholicism, and Postmillennial eschatology.

Biography
Boettner was born on March 7, 1901, in Linden, Missouri. His father, William Boettner, was a Christian school superintendent and had been born in Schwartzenhazel, Germany. He attended his father's church until he was eighteen, when he then joined his mother's church, the Centennial Methodist Church. Boettner attended the Lone Cedar and Fairview elementary schools, before going to Tarkio High School. In 1917, he studied agriculture at the University of Missouri in Columbia. A year later, he transferred to Tarkio Presbyterian College, where in 1925 he graduated with a Bachelor of Science degree.

In the fall of 1925, Boettner entered Princeton Theological Seminary, graduating in 1928 with a Th.B. The following year he obtained a Th.M. His master's thesis formed the basis of The Reformed Doctrine of Predestination. From 1929 to 1937 Boettner taught at the Pikeville College (University of Pikeville) in eastern Kentucky, where he met his wife, also a teacher. In 1933, Professor Boettner was awarded an honorary Doctor of Divinity degree from Tarkio College. In 1937, the Boettners left Pikeville for Washington, D.C., where he worked for the Library of Congress. From 1942 to 1947 he was employed by the Department of Internal Revenue.

In 1948, the Boettners joined Mrs. Boettner's sisters in Los Angeles, California, as they had offered to assist with her care, due to her declining health. In 1957 Tarkio College also awarded him an honorary Doctor of Letters degree. Upon his wife's death, in 1958, Boettner returned to his home state, settling in Rock Port, Missouri, where he remained the rest of his life.

He was a member of the Orthodox Presbyterian Church.

While his daily vocation was not theology or Biblical studies, he continued to write and publish books until near his death, the most successful of which were The Reformed Doctrine of Predestination and Roman Catholicism, Boettner's critical commentary on the Roman Catholic faith. This book has been called by its critics "The Anti-Catholic Bible" because of the author's aim to antagonize the Catholic Church, which, according to Catholic scholars, "has gravely compromised his intellectual objectivity". A recent doctoral study (Catholic) claims that the research done by Boettner in Roman Catholicism "is simply flimsy" and makes use of old and refuted anti-Catholic clichés.

The Reformed Doctrine of Predestination and Immortality was translated into Chinese by Charles H. Chao (1952, 1962), into German by Ivo Carobbio, and into Japanese.

Works 
 The Christian Attitude Towards War (1st ed. 1940, 3rd ed. 1985) 
 The Reformed Doctrine of Predestination (1932) 
 Harmony of the Gospels (1933) (1976) 
 A Summary of the Gospels (1934)
 The Inspiration of the Scriptures (1940)
 The Atonement (1941)
 The Person of Christ (1943) 
 Studies in Theology (1947) 
 A history of the Boettner family (1954)
 Immortality (1956) 
 The Millennium (1957) revised ed. (1984) 
 Divorce (1960) 
 Roman Catholicism (1962) revised ed. (1966) 
 The Mass (1966)
 The Reformed Faith (1983)

References

External links

The Reformed Doctrine of Predestination at Christian Classics Ethereal Library
Loraine Boettner Papers manuscripts held at the PCA Historical Center
Writings by Boettner
The Anti-Catholic Bible Criticism of Boettner's writings about the Catholic Church

American Calvinist and Reformed theologians
Critics of the Catholic Church
Princeton Theological Seminary alumni
University of Pikeville faculty
Orthodox Presbyterian Church members
1901 births
1990 deaths
20th-century Calvinist and Reformed theologians
20th-century American non-fiction writers
People from Atchison County, Missouri
People from Rock Port, Missouri